The 2019 Uruguayan Segunda División is the season of second division professional of football in Uruguay. A total of 12 teams will compete; the top two teams and the winner of the Championship play-offs are promoted to the Uruguayan Primera División.

Club information

Standings

Promotion Playoffs

Semi-finals

First Leg

Second Leg

Finals

Relegation

References

See also
2019 in Uruguayan football

Uruguayan Segunda División seasons
2019 in Uruguayan football